Within the broad movement of new-age music, neoclassical new-age music is influenced by and sometimes also based upon  baroque or classical music, especially in terms of melody and composition. The artist may offer a modern arrangement of a work by an established composer or combine elements from classical styles with modern elements to produce original compositions. Many artists within this subgenre are classically trained musicians. Although there is a wide variety of individual styles, neoclassical new-age music is generally melodic, harmonic, and instrumental, using both traditional musical instruments as well as electronic instruments.

Characteristics 
Neoclassical new-age music takes a lot of its inspiration from baroque/classical music for its style. Music of this genre is primarily instrumental and heavily takes elements from classical music while drawing on religious traditions from around the world to give it more of a "mystical" vibe to the music. Neoclassical new-age music has also been characterized by its smooth and romantic sound.

Artists and composers 

 Chris Field
 Mannheim Steamroller

Neoclassical new-age music composer Chris Field has created neoclassical music for many movie trailers for years. Some of these movie trailers including The Lord of the Rings, Harry Potter and the Philosophers Stone, and Alice in Wonderland. Fields has also won the best neoclassical album of 2006 for his album Sub-Conscious.

Mannheim Steamroller is a neoclassical band that has been very successful. They have sold over 41 million albums and produced a Christmas album that went on to sell 5 million copies. Mannheim Steamroller has received 19 gold, 8 platinum and 4 multi-platinum from the RIAA.

Labels 

 American Gramaphone
 Koch records
 Narada Productions
 Windham Hill Records
 Erased Tapes Records

References

Music